Mamola Bai (1715-1795) was the Rajput wife of Yar Mohammad Khan the Nawab of Bhopal and step-mother of Faiz Mohammad Khan. She effectively ruled the Bhopal State for nearly 50 years, in name of her two stepsons Faiz and Hayat.

See also
 Nawab of Bhopal

References

18th-century Indian royalty
1715 births
1795 deaths
History of Bhopal
Politicians from Bhopal
Women from Madhya Pradesh
Indian female royalty
18th-century Indian women politicians
18th-century Indian politicians